Adolfo Apolloni (1 March 1855 – 19 October 1923) was an Italian sculptor. He was born in Rome, in what was then the Papal States. He attended the Accademia di San Luca. He participated in an international art exposition in Venice in 1899. He was mayor of Rome (1919–1920). He died in Rome, Kingdom of Italy.

References

External links
 

1855 births
1923 deaths
19th-century Italian sculptors
Italian male sculptors
20th-century Italian sculptors
20th-century Italian male artists
Mayors of Rome
19th-century Italian male artists